Christer Adelsbo, born 1962, is a Swedish social democratic politician who has been a member of the Riksdag since 2002.

References

1962 births
Living people
Members of the Riksdag from the Social Democrats
Members of the Riksdag 2002–2006
Members of the Riksdag 2006–2010